Barobo, officially the Municipality of Barobo (Surigaonon: Lungsod nan Barobo), is a 3rd class municipality in the province of Surigao del Sur, Philippines. According to the 2020 census, it has a population of 53,146 people.

History 
Legend has it that the Manobo tribesmen first inhabited the area in the central part of Surigao del Sur. Sometime in the 1930s, five families who were engaged in fishing landed in the up-end of the river, and settled in the area for easy access to the fishing grounds. The area became known for its bountiful fish catch, and therefore more people from neighboring areas also came and settled. The distinctive visual quality of the area was an endemic species of tree known as "barobo" (diplodiscus paniculatus), which was plentiful on the site of the settlement. Subsequently, the place became popularly known as Barobo.

Barobo subsequently became a barrio under the municipality of Lianga. The creation of the province of Surigao del Sur under R.A. No. 2786, series of June 1960, created the municipality of Barobo on October 24, 1960, by virtue of Executive Order No. 407 issued by President Carlos P. Garcia. Thus the Municipality of Barobo was carved out (in a shape resembling that of a cigar pipe) from its mother municipality, Lianga.

Geography 
Barobo lies in the central part of the province of Surigao del Sur. It is located between 8'34'00" and 8'25'00" latitude and 125'59"00 and 126'22'4" longitude. It is bounded on the north by Lianga Bay and the municipality of Lianga, on the south by the municipality of Tagbina, on the southeast by the municipality of Hinatuan, on the east by the Pacific Ocean, and on the west by the municipality of San Francisco, Agusan del Sur.

Tourism
 of its total land is used for the tourism industry with declared tourist destinations namely, Turtle Island, Kabgan Island, Vanishing Islet, Pongpong Resort, Pagbutuanan Cave, Bogac Spring, Bito Lagoon, and Dapdap Beach Resorts. The Barobo River was named as the cleanest urban river in the country by numerous blogging award-giving bodies.

Barangays
Barobo is politically subdivided into 22 barangays.

Climate

Barobo has a tropical rainforest climate (Af) with heavy to very heavy rainfall year-round.

Demographics

Language 
A native Barobohanon speaks Kamayo, a minor language spoken in the area of Barobo and also in Bislig, San Agustin and Marihatag, Surigao del Sur province in the southern Philippines. It has 7,565 speakers (2000, WCD). The dialect known as "Kamayo" varies from one municipality to another — Lingiganons are quite different from other municipalities on the way they speak the Kamayo language.

Economy

References

External links
 Barobo Profile at PhilAtlas.com
 Barobo Profile at the DTI Cities and Municipalities Competitive Index
 [ Philippine Standard Geographic Code]
 Philippine Census Information
 Local Governance Performance Management System

Municipalities of Surigao del Sur
Establishments by Philippine executive order